The women's team time trial of the 1994 UCI Road World Championships cycling event took place on 21 August 1994 in Palermo, Italy. The course was 50.2 km long.

Final classification

Source

References

1994 UCI Road World Championships
UCI Road World Championships – Women's team time trial
1994 in women's road cycling